Three Years is an 1895 novella by Anton Chekhov originally published in the January and February 1895 issues of Russkaya Mysl. At 130 pages it is Chekhov's second-longest narrative. The story takes a negative position on the progress of society, featuring individuals of the merchant and factory owner class and their workers, without offering political solutions.

Background
In a September 1894 letter Chekhov informed Maria Chekhova that he was writing "a novel from the Moscow life for Russkaya Mysl. In his December letter to the singer Elena Shavrova he expressed his dissatisfaction with the way the work was going. "The original idea was one thing, but something different evolves out of it, something more languid... I am sick of writing of all these habitual  things, I'd like to write of demons, of frightening, volcanic women, of wizards, but alas! – what they demand of me is right-minded novellas about Ivan Gavrilovichs and their wives."

Publication
The novella came out with huge gaps caused by censorship. "The January issue of Russkaya Mysl has been arrested, then acquitted. From my story the censors threw out everything that had anything to do with religion. Russkaya Mysl is the journal that has to send its articled for the preliminary censorship procedure. Such things kill off all the urge to write, leaves with the feeling of a bone stuck in your throat," Chekhov complained in a  January 1895 letter to his friend Alexey Suvorin.

Critical response
Generally the response to the novella was warm, even if some reviewers found the plotline 'hazy' and its characters 'sketchy'. Alexander Skabichevsky reviewed the novella positively and expressed his delight with the Alexey Laptev character whom he described as 'the Hamlet of Zamoskvorechye'.

Along with three other stories and novellas, "The Ward No. 6", "The Story of an Unknown Man" and "A Woman's Kingdom", Three Years served as a turning point in Chekhov's career. The critics started to recognize him as a new major force in Russian literature and 'a worthy heir to the old masters', according to Sergey Andreevsky.

Notes

References

Novellas by Anton Chekhov
1895 novels